Newcastle Coach Station is a coach station located in Newcastle upon Tyne. It opened in 2003, as a replacement for the former Gallowgate Coach Station. 

The coach station is located on Churchill Street, and is a short walk from Newcastle Central railway station. It is one of three bus stations in the city centre – the others being Eldon Square and Haymarket.

The coach station has five bays, with facilities including a booking office, waiting room, seating and toilet facilities. A taxi rank is available on Churchill Street. Above the bays is a translucent curved canopy roof, with a glazed block screen wall.

Newcastle Coach Station is served mainly by National Express, however, it is also used by a number of independent operators – including JH Coaches and Wright Bros. of Alston. The station is not served by Megabus, with services instead using a stop on John Dobson Street, adjacent to Newcastle City Library.

See also
 Eldon Square Bus Station
 Haymarket Bus Station

References

External links

Bus stations in Tyne and Wear
2003 establishments in England
Transport in Newcastle upon Tyne
Buildings and structures in Newcastle upon Tyne